The Roman Catholic Diocese of Les Cayes, erected 3 October 1861, is a suffragan of the Archdiocese of Port-au-Prince.

History
The ecclesiastical province of Port-au-Prince (the archdiocese and the four suffragan dioceses of Cap Haïtien, Gonaives, Les Cayes, and Port-de-Paix) dates from the reorganization following upon the Concordat of 1860 between Pope Pius IX and the Republic of Haiti.

Bishops

Ordinaries
Jean-Marie-Alexandre Morice (1893–1914)
Ignace-Marie Le Ruzic (1916–1919)
Jules-Victor-Marie Pichon (1919–1941)
François-Joseph Person (1941-1941)
Jean Louis Collignan, O.M.I. (1942–1966)
Jean-Jacques Claudius Angénor (1966–1988)
Jean Alix Verrier (1988–2009)
Guire Poulard (2009–2011); named Archbishop of Port-au-Prince
Chibly Langlois (since 2011); elevated to Cardinal in 2014

Coadjutor bishops
François-Joseph Person (1937-1941)
Jean Alix Verrier (1985-1988)

Auxiliary bishop
Charles-Edouard Peters, S.M.M. (1966-1972), appointed Bishop of Jérémie

Other priests of this diocese who became bishops
Joseph Willy Romélus, appointed Bishop of Jérémie in 1977
Joseph Gontrand Décoste (priest here, 1994–1998), appointed Bishop of Jérémie in 2009

Territorial losses

References

External links

GCatholic.org page for Diocese of Les Cayes

1893 establishments in Haiti
Les Cayes
Les Cayes
Les Cayes
Les Cayes
Roman Catholic Ecclesiastical Province of Port-au-Prince